Tere Naam is a 2003 Indian Hindi-language romantic tragedy film directed by Satish Kaushik. Written by Bala and Jainendra Jain, the film stars Salman Khan and Bhumika Chawla in her Hindi film debut. It is a remake of Bala's own Tamil film Sethu (1999) featured Vikram in the lead role.

The film was based on a real-life incident of a friend of Bala's, who had fallen in love, lost his mind and ended up at a mental asylum. Tere Naam was released on 15 August 2003 and became a moderate box-office success, although its soundtrack album was a blockbuster. Khan was praised for his portrayal of Radhe Mohan and the role is widely considered to be his best performance till date.

Tere Naam was nominated for a total of 24 Awards, winning 7 of them, including 8 Filmfare Award nominations.

Plot
Radhe Mohan is a jobless rowdy, surrounded by a rough circle. He lives with his brother Ajay, his sister-in-law Gayatri, and their child. He is a violent man, but often performs good deeds, such as beating up sexual harassers.

Radhe falls in love with Nirjara Bhardwaj, a student at his former college and the daughter of a poor temple priest. Radhe helps her a few times, and she seems to like him. One day, Radhe proposes to her and jokingly remarks that he would beat her father up if he doesn't agree to their marriage. Nirjara is too shocked to say much and utters "Yes" when Radhe asks her if she was listening to him. Radhe interprets this as her acceptance of the proposal. Later, he and his friends intimidate Nirjara's fiancé Rameshwar. The next day, Radhe brings her a gift, but she tells him that she does not love him, and calls him a goon. A heartbroken Radhe subsequently tries to talk to her, but she refuses to engage in a conversation.

Radhe's friends suggest that he give up rowdyism and violence to impress Nirjara, but one day, he roughs up a brothel owner who had beaten up one of his friends. As Radhe is about to punch the brothel owner, Nirjara arrives at the scene, and Radhe stops the violence, allowing the brothel owner to escape. Subsequently, Nirjara's elder sister Mamata, who is in need of money, is nearly tricked into prostitution, when she visits the brothel to meet a man who promises her a loan. Radhe, who does not know that she is Nirjara's sister, visits the same brothel to find a man who had harassed a woman. He saves Mamata from being arrested during a police raid. She tells him that her husband Aatmaram has evicted her, and is demanding money to give her the custody of their son. The next day, Radhe beats up Aatmaram, forcing him to take her back and to stop harassing her. Rameshwar sees this and tells Nirjara that Radhe is a good, selfless man, who truly loves her. Unaware of this conversation, Radhe abducts Nirjara (which is extremely ironic to what Rameshwar was telling about him) so that she would listen to him express his feelings for her. Nirjara initially feels intimidated, but ultimately falls in love with him.

Subsequently, the brothel owner and his goons attack Radhe to take revenge on him for trying to shut down their business. Radhe suffers from brain damage during the attack and loses his mental balance. His family admits him to a religious institution for mental patients, as Nirjara and his friends pray for him. At one point, Radhe's mental state returns to normal, but the wardens do not understand this and beat him up. Nirjara visits the institution and sees him in a pitiful condition while he is sleeping. Convinced that Radhe is not going to get well, Radhe's brother asks her to forget him and marry Rameshwar. On the day of Nirjara's wedding with Rameshwar, Radhe escapes from the institution, and arrives at her home, only to find that she has committed suicide. Radhe then allows himself to be taken back to the institution despite his family and friends trying to persuade him otherwise. The epilogue shows Radhe, now old and still in the institution, tying peacock feathers in Nirjara's memory.

Cast

Production
Anurag Kashyap was hired to direct the film but was later removed from the film as he wanted Salman Khan to not shave his chest as the character of Radhe hailed from Uttar Pradesh where men are known to be very raw in terms of appearance.

Casting
Ameesha Patel was originally considered to play the role of Nirjara, but scheduling conflicts prevented her from accepting. The role was offered to Bhumika Chawla, who made her Bollywood debut in the film.

Soundtrack

The soundtrack of the film contains 12 songs. The music was composed by Himesh Reshammiya and Sajid–Wajid with lyrics by Sameer and Jalees Sherwani. Upon its release the soundtrack album became a massive super hit with its song gaining huge popularity and becoming Chartbusters especially the title track, tumse milna, oodhni, kyo Kisi ko, O Jaana,  the soundtrack sold around 3 million copies becoming the highest selling Indian music album of the year in India.

Track list

Home video
The film was released on Blu-ray Disc on 13 December 2010 by Eros International.

Critical reception
Taran Adarsh of Bollywood Hungama awarded 3/5 stars and wrote, "Salman is exceptional in a role that fits him to the T. He breathes fire in sequences that demand uneasiness. But beneath the tough exterior lies a vulnerable person and this facet in particular comes to the fore in the latter reels. His emotional outbursts are splendid..., Bhoomika Chawla reminds you of Bhagyashree. Her simple, humble, traditionally indian character should go down very well with the viewers. Her performance is first-rate".

Planet Bollywood rated 8.0/10 to the film and wrote, "Salman Khan puts his heart and soul into his performance. He is equally at ease in romantic, emotional and even in Mahendra Verma's well conceived action scene. Bhoomika Chawla impresses in her first hindi movie. The supporting cast of Sachin Khedekar, Sarfaraz Khan and Ravi Kishan is reasonably good. The music by Himesh Reshammiya goes well with the movie". Madhureeta Mukherjee of The Times of India said, "Salman has given the great performance in the film. He's given an intense, unconventional performance. Believe this is the best performance of Salman's career so far".

Box office
The film's total gross was  24.54 crore worldwide and was a moderate commercial success.

Awards

Winner

Nominated

References

External links
 
 
 

2000s Hindi-language films
2003 films
Films scored by Himesh Reshammiya
Films scored by Sajid–Wajid
Hindi remakes of Tamil films
Indian romantic action films
Indian romantic drama films
Films about amnesia
Films directed by Satish Kaushik
2003 romantic drama films